The B-theorem is a mathematical finite group theory result formerly known as the B-conjecture.

References

Theorems about finite groups
Conjectures that have been proved